Bad Buzz is the third EP by The Mint Chicks, released in February 2010 by MusicHy.pe.  Title track "Bad Buzz" was featured on 95bfm's "Newsgood" segment co-hosted by guitarist Ruban Nielson in January 2010, and it was revealed by website MusicHy.pe that the EP will be released on a limited edition USB stick. The USB, designed by Ruban Nielson, was sent out to fans from the 15th of February, 2010.

Track listing

Personnel

Kody Nielson - vocals, keyboards, drums
Ruban Nielson - guitar, bass
Howie Weinberg - mastering

2010 EPs
The Mint Chicks albums